Athanasios Tsourakis (born 12 May 1990) is a Greek professional footballer who plays as a midfielder for VfB Speldorf.

References

External links

1990 births
Footballers from Alexandroupolis
Living people
Greek footballers
Association football defenders
MSV Duisburg II players
3. Liga players